Burke Rehabilitation Hospital is a non-profit, 150-bed acute rehabilitation hospital located in White Plains, New York. It is the only hospital in Westchester County entirely dedicated to rehabilitation medicine. Opening in 1915, Burke has been involved in medical rehabilitation for over one hundred years. As of January 2016, Burke is a member of the Montefiore Health System, Inc.

Burke provides inpatient and outpatient rehabilitation to patients with a broad range of neurological, musculoskeletal, cardiac, and pulmonary disabilities caused by disease or injury. Burke treats patients who have suffered a stroke, spinal cord injury, brain injury, amputations, complicated fractures, cardiac disease, arthritis and pulmonary disease as well as neurological disorders such as Alzheimer's disease, Parkinson's disease, and multiple sclerosis.

Patients are generally from the eastern United States, but Burke also sees patients from other parts of the U.S. and, through its International Patient Program, from abroad. It has approximately 600 employees and 17 full-time physicians.

Burke Rehabilitation Hospital is accredited by the Joint Commission and the Commission on Accreditation of Rehabilitation Facilities.

History
Burke Rehabilitation Hospital was established by John Masterson Burke through his Winifred Masterson Burke Relief Foundation, named in honor of his mother. The hospital opened its doors on April 7, 1915 and initially treated patients for pneumonia, ulcers, fatigue, cardiac and thyroid disease.

Along with medical supervision and treatments, the hospital's early programs also called for rigorous exercise and daily chores. It was one of the first institutions to encourage moderate exercise for cardiac patients, and also help in founding the American Heart Association in 1924.

During World War I, Burke was used as a naval hospital and served 2,000 sailors who became known as “Burke’s Navy.” The hospital's services were needed again after World War II when the number and nature of injuries suffered by veterans led to a renewed emphasis on physical and occupational therapies, improvements to prosthetic limbs and wheelchairs, and the development of community services.

In 1951, the same year the hospital became formally known as The Burke Rehabilitation Hospital, its focus became multi-disciplinary medical rehabilitation. Today, the hospital specializes in recovery from physical disabilities due to stroke, brain injuries, spinal cord injuries, Parkinson's disease, multiple sclerosis and other neurological disorders, cardiac disease, chronic pulmonary disease, arthritis, orthopedics and amputation.

Programs
The hospital provides the following services:

 Brain Injury Rehabilitation
 Cardiac Rehabilitation
 Fitness Programs
 Geriatric Services
 Health fairs and health screenings
 Neurological Rehabilitation
 Neuropsychology Services
 Nutrition Services
 Occupational therapy
 Orthopedic Rehabilitation
 Outpatient therapy
 Pain Management
 Pastoral Services
 Physical therapy
 Physician Practice
 Pulmonary Rehabilitation
 Residency Program
 Social Work/Case management and assistance with government services
 Speech therapy
 Spinal Cord Injury Rehabilitation
 Sports Medicine
 Stroke Rehabilitation
 Support Groups
 Wound management services

Notable staff
There are several Burke doctors who are in U.S. News & World Report's Doctors list. These doctors are:

 Karen Pechman, M.D., physiatrist, specializing in electrodiagnosis, musculoskeletal disorders, amputee rehabilitation, pain management and sports injuries. She was also selected as one of Westchester Magazine's top doctors in Westchester County.
 Dr. Oh-Park, Burke’ Chief Medical Officer, is board certified in Physical Medicine and Rehabilitation (PM&R), Electrodiagnostic Medicine, Neuromuscular Medicine, and Sports Medicine. She is an expert in rehabilitation of musculoskeletal and neuromuscular disorders and cares for a wide spectrum of individuals, from adult athletes to stroke patients. She is a Professor in the department of Rehabilitation Medicine and the department of Neurology at Albert Einstein College of Medicine. She is the recipient of 14 teaching awards and serves on the editorial board of the American Journal of PM&R.

References

External links 

 

Hospital buildings completed in 1915
Hospitals established in 1915
Hospitals in New York (state)
Buildings and structures in White Plains, New York
Hospitals in Westchester County, New York
Montefiore Health System
Rehabilitation hospitals